Francisco Mancebo Pérez (born 9 March 1976) is a Spanish professional cyclist, who currently rides for UCI Continental team .

Mancebo is a stage race specialist, with good climbing and individual time trial performances. He was the winner of the Spanish National Road Race Championships in 2004, and finished third in the Vuelta a España. He finished sixth in the 2004 Tour de France and fourth in the 2005 Tour de France. He also won a stage of the 2005 Vuelta a España and finished fourth in the general classification.

Career
Born in Madrid, Mancebo won the young rider classification at the 2000 Tour de France.

Mancebo was himself implicated in the Operación Puerto doping case and was pulled from that year's Tour de France on the eve of the race. Contrary to reports circulating at the time, Mancebo denies that he ever retired after news of the affair broke. "I never retired. Some journalists said I did, but that never happened", Mancebo told Cyclingnews. "I changed my focus."

In the 2009 season, he rode with the team . For 2010 he rode with Heraklion Kastro-Murcia and with the Canyon Bicycle's Team in the Tour of Utah, in an effort to defend his overall classification title. In 2011, he rode with the Realcyclist.com Cycling Team, where he was the #1 rider in the NRC standings.

Mancebo joined the Continental squad  for its debut season in 2014. He stayed with the team through to the 2016 season: in April 2017  announced that they had signed him for 2017.

Major results

1994
 3rd Road race, National Junior Road Championships
1997
 1st Stage 5b Vuelta a Navarra
 3rd Prueba Villafranca de Ordizia
 7th Road race, UCI Under-23 Road World Championships
1998
 1st Trofeo Foral de Navarra
1999
 3rd Circuito de Getxo
 5th Overall Vuelta a Andalucía
 5th Klasika Primavera
 6th Clásica de San Sebastián
 8th Overall Vuelta a La Rioja
2000
 1st  Overall Vuelta a Castilla y León
1st Stage 5
 1st Clásica a los Puertos de Guadarrama
 2nd Overall Route du Sud
1st Stage 2
 3rd Overall Paris–Nice
 7th Klasika Primavera
 9th Overall Tour de France
1st  Young rider classification
2001
 4th Overall Tour Méditerranéen
 5th Overall Route du Sud
 6th GP Miguel Induráin
 8th Klasika Primavera
 9th Overall Grand Prix du Midi Libre
 10th Giro di Lombardia
2002
 1st  Overall Vuelta a Burgos
 5th Overall Vuelta a Castilla y León
 5th Clásica a los Puertos de Guadarrama
 6th GP Miguel Induráin
 7th Overall Tour de France
 8th Overall Volta a Catalunya
 10th Klasika Primavera
 10th Giro di Lombardia
2003
 1st  Overall Vuelta a Castilla y León
1st Stage 1 (TTT)
 1st Classique des Alpes
 2nd Overall Vuelta a La Rioja
1st Points classification
 2nd Subida al Naranco
 2nd Memorial Galera
 4th Overall Critérium du Dauphiné Libéré
 5th Overall Vuelta a España
 9th Overall Vuelta a Aragón
 10th Overall Tour de France
2004
 1st  Road race, National Road Championships
 2nd Rund um die Hainleite
 3rd Overall Vuelta a España
 5th Overall Deutschland Tour
1st Stage 6
 5th Overall Vuelta a Aragón
 6th Overall Tour de France
 8th Overall Tour de Romandie
2005
 2nd Road race, National Road Championships
 2nd Japan Cup
 4th Overall Tour de France
 4th Overall Vuelta a España
1st Stage 10
 5th Overall Clásica Internacional de Alcobendas
 9th Clásica a los Puertos de Guadarrama
 10th Overall Critérium du Dauphiné Libéré
2006
 5th Overall Critérium du Dauphiné Libéré
1st  Points classification
 7th Overall Volta a Catalunya
2007
 1st Overall Vuelta a Chihuahua
 2nd Subida al Naranco
 3rd Overall Tour of Qinghai Lake
 3rd Overall Tour de San Luis
 4th Overall Route du Sud
 4th Overall Vuelta a Asturias
 5th Overall Vuelta por un Chile Líder
1st Stage 7b (ITT)
 5th Klasika Primavera
 6th Overall Vuelta a Andalucía
 6th Overall Volta a Catalunya
 7th GP Miguel Induráin
2008
 1st Overall Vuelta a Chihuahua
 2nd Overall Vuelta a la Comunidad de Madrid
 3rd Overall GP CTT Correios de Portugal
 6th Overall Clásica Internacional de Alcobendas
 6th Overall Volta a Portugal
 9th Gran Premio de Llodio
2009
 1st  Marathon cross-country, National Mountain Bike Championships
 1st  Overall Vuelta a Asturias
1st Stage 4
 1st  Overall Tour of Utah
1st Stage 1
 1st Stage 1 Tour of California
 2nd Cascade Cycling Classic
 4th Time trial, National Road Championships
 7th Overall Vuelta a Chihuahua
 9th Overall Vuelta a la Comunidad de Madrid
2010
 1st  Marathon cross-country, National Mountain Bike Championships
 1st Overall Tour de Guadeloupe
1st Stage 1 (ITT)
 1st Christmas Race
 2nd Overall Tour of Utah
 3rd Overall Tour of Bulgaria
 4th Overall Vuelta a la Comunidad de Madrid
 5th Overall Cinturó de l'Empordà
 6th Prueba Villafranca de Ordizia
 8th Overall 2009–10 UCI America Tour
 8th Time trial, National Road Championships
 10th Overall Tour de Beauce
2011
 1st Overall USA Cycling National Racing Calendar
 1st  Overall Tour of the Gila
1st  Mountains classification
1st Stages 1 & 5
 1st Overall Sea Otter Classic
1st Stages 2 & 3
 1st  Overall Tour de Beauce
1st  Points classification
1st Stage 3
 1st  Overall Redlands Bicycle Classic
1st Stage 1
 1st  Overall Cascade Cycling Classic
1st Stage 2
 1st Prueba Escuela de Alaejos
 4th Overall San Dimas Stage Race
 7th Overall Joe Martin Stage Race
1st Stage 1
2012
 1st Overall USA Cycling National Racing Calendar
 1st Overall Tucson Bicycle Classic
1st Stage 2
 1st Overall Joe Martin Stage Race
1st Stage 1
 1st  Overall Cascade Cycling Classic
1st Stage 1
 1st Tour of the Battenkill
 3rd Overall Redlands Bicycle Classic
 4th Overall Tour of the Gila
 7th Overall Tour de Beauce
1st Points classification
1st Stage 1
 7th Overall Rutas de América
 8th Taiwan KOM Challenge
 9th Overall San Dimas Stage Race
2013
 1st Overall USA Cycling National Racing Calendar
 1st  Overall Redlands Bicycle Classic
1st Stage 4
 2nd Overall Joe Martin Stage Race
 2nd Overall Vuelta a Castilla y León
 2nd Heber Valley Circuit Race
 3rd Overall Tour of the Gila
1st Stage 5
 4th Overall Tour de Beauce
1st Stage 3
 5th Overall 2012–13 UCI America Tour
 5th Overall Cascade Cycling Classic
 7th Overall Tour of California
 7th Overall Tour of Alberta
 7th Philadelphia International Cycling Classic
 9th Overall Tour of Utah
1st Stage 6
 10th Overall Tour of Taihu Lake
2014
 1st  Marathon cross-country, National Mountain Bike Championships
 1st  Overall Tour de Kumano
1st Stage 2
 1st El Ganso del Escorial
 Arab Games Clubs
2nd  Road race
2nd  Time trial
3rd  Team time trial
 3rd Overall Tour of Thailand
 4th Overall Sharjah International Cycling Tour
 5th Overall Jelajah Malaysia
 5th Melaka Governor's Cup
2015
 1st Overall Tour d'Egypte
1st Stage 1
 1st Overall Jelajah Malaysia
1st Stages 1 & 2 (TTT)
 2nd El Ganso del Escorial
 3rd Overall Sharjah International Cycling Tour
 4th Klasika Primavera
 5th Overall Tour de Langkawi
 5th Overall Tour of Japan
 7th Overall La Tropicale Amissa Bongo
 8th GP Miguel Induráin
 9th Overall Tour of Taihu Lake
 10th Overall Vuelta a Castilla y León
 10th Overall Cascade Cycling Classic
1st Stage 1
2016
 1st  Marathon cross-country, National Mountain Bike Championships
 1st El Ganso del Escorial
 1st Stage 5 Tour of Alberta
 2nd Overall Tour de Taiwan
 2nd Overall Sharjah International Cycling Tour
1st Stage 1 (TTT)
 2nd Memorial Clavero
 4th Overall Tour de Langkawi
2017
 1st Stage 5 Redlands Bicycle Classic
 4th Overall Grand Prix Cycliste de Saguenay
2018
 2nd Overall Tour de Guadeloupe
 5th Winston-Salem Cycling Classic
 6th Overall Tour du Maroc
 7th Road race, National Road Championships
2019
 1st Overall Ronda Pilipinas
1st Stage 1
 1st Overall Minamiuonuma Road - Ronde Van Japan
 1st Mountains classification Vuelta a la Comunidad de Madrid
 2nd Overall Ministry of Economy Commerce and Industry Japan
 3rd Overall Akiyoshidai Karst Race, Japan
 4th Overall Tour of Japan
 4th Japan Cup
 6th Overall Tour de Tochigi
 9th Overall Tour de Kumano
2020
 1st Overall Ministry of Economy Commerce and Industry Japan
2021
 1st Oita Urban Classic
 4th Overall Tour of Japan
2022
 6th Overall Tour of Japan
 6th Oita Urban Classic
 10th Overall Tour de Kumano

Grand Tour general classification results timeline

References

External links

1976 births
Living people
Spanish male cyclists
Cyclists from Madrid
Spanish Vuelta a España stage winners
Doping cases in cycling
Spanish sportspeople in doping cases